Karsten Einar Isachsen (22 February 1944 – 18 January 2016) was a Norwegian Lutheran priest, essayist and popular speaker.

He was born in Oslo to Knut Isachsen and Margit Lolloe Gjertsen. Among his books are the speech and essay collections Gjester som ikke vil gå from 1978, Fjellet som flyttet seg (1979), Vis meg ditt ansikt (1982), and Før vi går fra hverandre from 1987. He was decorated Knight, First Class of the Order of St. Olav in 2014. He died in Ål in 2016.

Selected works

References

1944 births
2016 deaths
Clergy from Oslo
Norwegian essayists
Norwegian religious writers